Tuncel is a Turkish given name for males and a surname. Notable people with the surname include:

Given name
 Tuncel Kurtiz (1936–2013), Turkish actor, playwright and film director

Surname
 Funda İyce Tuncel (born 1968), Turkish female painter
 Merve Tuncel (born 2005), Turkish female swimmer
 Sebahat Tuncel (born 1975), Turkish female politician

Turkish-language surnames
Turkish masculine given names